Viadangos de Arbas or Viadangos de Arbás is a locality and minor local entity located in the municipality of Villamanín, in León province, Castile and León, Spain. As of 2020, it has a population of 28.

Geography 
Viadangos de Arbas is located 79km north-northwest of León.

References

Populated places in the Province of León